Stanley is an unincorporated community in Santa Fe County, New Mexico. The ZIP code is 87056.

Demographics

History
On January 18, 1975, Stanley was referenced in Hee Haw.

Climate
Climate type occurs primarily on the periphery of the true deserts in low-latitude semiarid steppe regions.  The Köppen Climate Classification sub-type for this climate is BSk (Tropical and Subtropical Steppe Climate).

Education
Stanley is in the Moriarty Municipal Schools district.

It was formerly in the Santa Fe School District, which operated a school in Stanley, which in 1962 had 150 students. In 1962 that district's school board approved a plan to have the district moved to Moriarty Municipal Schools. The superintendent of the Santa Fe district advocated for closing the Stanley School because of the following reasons: was in close proximity to the one of Moriarty, that it would not be viable as an elementary only school if only the high school were closed, the poor physical state of the building and it was not meeting the academic benchmarks set by the state government of New Mexico.

Notable people
 Alan Ebnother, artist
 Jeffrey Epstein, financier, convicted sex offender, owned a rural compound located approximately eight miles north of Stanley
 Bruce King , 23rd, 25th and 28th Governor of New Mexico
 Gary King , 30th Attorney General of New Mexico and son of Bruce King
David W. King, 25th Treasurer of New Mexico

References

Unincorporated communities in New Mexico
Unincorporated communities in Santa Fe County, New Mexico